Sweetheart of the Campus (also released as Broadway Ahead) is a 1941 American musical comedy film directed by Edward Dmytryk and starring Ruby Keeler, Ozzie Nelson, and Harriet Hilliard.

Plot
Betty Blake (Ruby Keeler) is a lead vocalist for Ozzie Norton's (Ozzie Nelson) orchestra. While performing a one-night stand at a college campus, Betty vows to prevent a hostile takeover of the establishment by puritanical trustee Minnie Sparr (Kathleen Howard). To this end, Betty, Ozzie and his entire band enroll as college students.

Cast
 Ruby Keeler as Betty Blake
 Ozzie Nelson as Ozzie Norton
 Harriet Hilliard as Harriet Hale
 Gordon Oliver as Terry Jones
 Don Beddoe as Sheriff Denby
 Charles Judels as Tomasso/Victor Demond
 Kathleen Howard as Mrs. Minnie Sparr
 Byron Foulger as Dr. Bailey
 George Lessey as Dr. Hale
 Frank Gaby as Dr. Grimsby
 Leo Watson as Tom Tom
 Four Spirits of Rhythm as Tom Tom's accompanists

References

External links
 
 
 
 

1941 films
1941 musical comedy films
American black-and-white films
Films directed by Edward Dmytryk
American musical comedy films
Columbia Pictures films
Films set in universities and colleges
1940s English-language films
1940s American films